Viktoriya Viktorovna Zyabkina (Cyrillic: Виктория Викторовна Зябкина; born 4 September 1992) is a Kazakhstani sprinter who mostly competes in the 100 m and 200 m distances. She represented her country at the 2012 and 2016 Summer Olympics, but failed to reach the finals. She won a silver and a bronze medal in the 4 × 100 m relay at the 2014 and 2018 Asian Games, respectively. Between 2013 and 2017 she won five gold and one silver medals at the Asian Championships, five of them in individual events.

Personal life
Zyabkina took up athletics in 2002 following her parents. Her father Viktor Zyabkin was a member of the Soviet national 4 × 100 m relay team. Her mother Oksana Zelinskaya competed for the Soviet Union in triple jump and was an Asian champion in this event. Zyabkina debuted internationally in 2010. She has degrees in sports education from the Al-Farabi Kazakh National University and in English-Russian translation from the Turan University.

Competition record

1Disqualified in the final

References

1992 births
Living people
Sportspeople from Almaty
Kazakhstani female sprinters
Olympic female sprinters
Olympic athletes of Kazakhstan
Athletes (track and field) at the 2012 Summer Olympics
Athletes (track and field) at the 2016 Summer Olympics
Asian Games silver medalists for Kazakhstan
Asian Games bronze medalists for Kazakhstan
Asian Games medalists in athletics (track and field)
Athletes (track and field) at the 2010 Asian Games
Athletes (track and field) at the 2014 Asian Games
Athletes (track and field) at the 2018 Asian Games
Medalists at the 2014 Asian Games
Medalists at the 2018 Asian Games
Universiade gold medalists in athletics (track and field)
Universiade gold medalists for Kazakhstan
Medalists at the 2015 Summer Universiade
World Athletics Championships athletes for Kazakhstan
Asian Athletics Championships winners
Asian Indoor Athletics Championships winners
Al-Farabi Kazakh National University alumni
21st-century Kazakhstani women